Holger Johansson (18 January 1911 – 14 February 1992) was a Swedish footballer who played as a forward. He made two appearances for the Sweden national team in 1932. He was also part of Sweden's squad for the football tournament at the 1936 Summer Olympics, but he did not play in any matches.

References

External links
 

1911 births
1992 deaths
Swedish footballers
Association football forwards
Sweden international footballers
Footballers from Gothenburg